Pseudoclausena is a monotypic genus of flowering plants belonging to the family Meliaceae. The only species is Pseudoclausena chrysogyne.

Its native range is Indo-China to New Guinea.

References

Meliaceae
Meliaceae genera
Monotypic Sapindales genera